Hannes Tauriainen (17 March 1909 – 29 August 1971) was a Finnish smallholder and politician, born in Suomussalmi. He was imprisoned from 1939 to 1944 for political reasons. Tauriainen was a Member of the Parliament of Finland from 1948 to 1966, representing the Finnish People's Democratic League (SKDL).

References

1909 births
1971 deaths
People from Suomussalmi
People from Oulu Province (Grand Duchy of Finland)
Finnish People's Democratic League politicians
Members of the Parliament of Finland (1948–51)
Members of the Parliament of Finland (1951–54)
Members of the Parliament of Finland (1954–58)
Members of the Parliament of Finland (1958–62)
Members of the Parliament of Finland (1962–66)
Prisoners and detainees of Finland